The Sexual Offenses Bill, 2019 was a bill in Uganda that consolidated a number of previous laws regarding sexual offences, introduced some provisions toward addressing sexual violence, and criminalised same-sex relationships. The bill was passed by the Parliament of Uganda on 5 May 2021, but was vetoed by President Yoweri Museveni on 18 August 2021.

Legislative history 
The bill was introduced by Kumi District Woman Representative Monicah Amoding in 2015, the year after The Anti-Homosexuality Act, 2014 was signed into law but subsequently struck down by the Constitutional Court of Uganda on procedural grounds. Amoding's bill then spent four years under review by the Committee on Legal and Parliamentary Affairs before returning to Parliament in February 2019. A number of amendments were then proposed during parliamentary debates, among others an amendment that would've made consent required for sexual acts but that failed to gain majority support.

It was passed by the Parliament of Uganda in early May 2021. In August 2021, President Yoweri Museveni vetoed it, suggesting much of its content is already covered  by existing legislation and sending it back to Parliament to address these redundancies. Museveni reportedly also had concerns about foreign policy implications and democratic buy-in and felt it was not politically advantageous to sign it as he had already recently won re-election.

Reception 
Human Rights Watch called on the Ugandan president to veto the law, stating that "Ugandan lawmakers should focus on ending endemic sexual violence rather than seeing this as an opportunity to imbed abusive provisions that criminalize the sex lives of consenting adults." Concerns have also been raised about the impact the bill would have on the HIV/AIDS epidemic in Uganda.

References

See also  
 The Anti-Homosexuality Act, 2014
 LGBT rights in Uganda
 LGBT history in Uganda

Law of Uganda
LGBT rights in Uganda
LGBT-related legislation
Criminalization of homosexuality
Homophobia
Censorship of LGBT issues
2019 in LGBT history